The 1999/2000 NTFL season was the 79th season of the Northern Territory Football League (NTFL).

Waratah have won there 15th premiership title while defeating the Palmerston Magpies in the grand final by 40 points.

Grand Final

References

Northern Territory Football League seasons
NTFL